Incompetence is the inability to perform; lack of competence; ineptitude.

Aspects of incompetence include:

Administrative incompetence, dysfunctional administrative behaviors that hinder attainment of organization goals
Incompetence (law), a person not of sound mind or mentally impaired, unable to make decisions for themself
Military incompetence, failures of members of the military
Social ineptitude

Incompetence may also refer to:

Incompetence (geology), 
Incompetence (novel), a comedy novel published in 2003 by Red Dwarf co-creator Rob Grant

See also
Competence (disambiguation)
Darwin Awards, a tongue-in-cheek "award" given to people whose incompetence results in their death or loss of ability to reproduce
Parody, a form of humor that often employs feigned incompetence
Peter principle, tendency for a person to rise to his or her level of incompetence
Dunning–Kruger effect, the tendency for incompetent people to grossly overestimate their skills